The 2023 Salt Lake City mayoral election will take place in 2023 to elect the mayor of Salt Lake City, Utah. The election will be officially nonpartisan. Incumbent mayor Erin Mendenhall is eligible to run for re-election to a second term in office.

Candidates

Declared
Rocky Anderson, former mayor (Party affiliation: Justice)
Michael Valentine, activist

Potential
Erin Mendenhall, incumbent mayor (Party affiliation: Democratic)

Endorsements

References

Salt Lake City
Mayoral elections in Salt Lake City
Salt Lake City